Oseleye D. Ojuka is a Nigerian businessman and politician.  He was born into a Christian family on August 29, 1956, in Kaduna to Pastor and Elder (Mrs.) Morland Dennis Ojuka who come from the Dabiri Dennis Ojuka and Numbere Bobonari families respectively all of Buguma in Asari Toru LGA.

Politics

ANPP State Secretary (2003–2006) 
After a military intervention ended the Third Nigerian Republic. Ojuka went into the private sector as a businessman and joined the grassroots democratic movement during the Abacha Regime, which was short lived due to the death of Abacha. Under the new regime of Abdusalami Abubakar, Ojuka became a foundation member of PDP in Asari Toru LGA, and worked closely with Dr. Ombo Isokariari.  However, the division that resulted in the PDP National Party elections in 2001 led to Hon. Ojuka joining the ANPP at the merger between APP and UNPP. Hon. Ojuka became the Rivers State Secretary of ANPP in 2003, a position he held till 2006, when he voluntarily resigned and went back to PDP and became an Elder in the Kalabari PDP elders forum.

Governor's race (2015) 
In the election of 2015, Hon. Ojuka campaigned for the Rivers State governorship Primaries but did not secure the ticket. He is at present the leader of PDP Ward I in Asari Toru LGA, where he is registered as a party member.

References

1956 births
Living people
Nigerian businesspeople
Peoples Democratic Party (Nigeria) politicians